Rose Mary Barton  (Dublin 21 April 1856 – 1929) was an Anglo-Irish artist; a watercolourist who painted landscape, street scenes, gardens, child portraiture and illustrations of the townscape of Britain and Ireland. Barton exhibited with a number of different painting societies, most notably the Watercolour Society of Ireland (WCSI), the Royal Academy (RA), the Royal Hibernian Academy (RHA), the Society of Women Artists and the Royal Watercolour Society (RWS). She became a full member of the  RWS in 1911. Her paintings are in public collections of Irish painting in both Ireland and Britain, including the National Gallery of Ireland and Dublin City Gallery The Hugh Lane in Dublin, and the Ulster Museum in Belfast.

Life
Rose Barton was born in Dublin in 1856. Her father was a lawyer from Rochestown, County Tipperary, and her mother family was from County Galway. Educated privately, she was a liberal in social affairs. Her interests included horseracing. She was cousins with sisters, Eva Henrietta and Letitia Marion Hamilton.
She began exhibiting her broad-wash watercolours painting with the Watercolour Society of Ireland (WCSI) in 1872. Rose and her sister Emily visited Brussels in 1875, they received drawing tuition in drawing and fine art painting under the French artist, Henri Gervex. There along with her close friend Mildred Anne Butler she began to study figure painting and figure drawing.

In 1879, she joined the local committee of the Irish Fine Art Society. Afterwards she trained at Paul Jacob Naftel's art studio in London. Rose like Butler, studied under Naftel. In 1882 she exhibited her picture Dead Game, at the Royal Hibernian Academy (RHA). In 1884, she exhibited at the Royal Academy (RA). Later, she showed at the Japanese Gallery, the Dudley Gallery and the Grosvenor Gallery in London. In 1893, she became an associate member of the Society of Painters in Water Colours, attaining full membership in 1911.

Barton's watercolours and townscapes were becoming well known in both Dublin and London. This was helped by her illustrations in books of both cities including Picturesque Dublin, Old and New by Francis Farmer and her own book Familiar London.

Works
 The Garden of Lindsey House, London. 1917
 Going to the Levée at Dublin Castle. 1897
 Hop Pickers in Kent Returning Home. 1894
 A Rest in Rotten Row. 1892
 Charing Cross Bridge, London. 1896
 The Carlyle statue, Chelsea
 The Carlyle statue, Chelsea
 College Green, Dublin
 Evening On The River Liffey With St. John's Church In Distance
 Hyde Park Corner, With Household Cavalry
 Nelson's Column In A Fog
 Westminster Abbey

References

Cited

External links

 
 
 

1856 births
1929 deaths
People from County Tipperary
Irish illustrators
19th-century Irish painters
20th-century Irish painters
Irish women painters
20th-century Irish women artists
19th-century Irish women artists